This is a list of adult nonfiction books that topped The New York Times Nonfiction Best Seller list in 1978.

See also

 New York Times Fiction Best Sellers of 1978
 1978 in literature
 Lists of The New York Times Nonfiction Best Sellers
 Publishers Weekly list of bestselling novels in the United States in the 1970s

References

1978
.
1978 in the United States